Inside Outside was founded by Dutch designer Petra Blaisse in 1991. The firm combine expertise in various fields including landscape architecture, textile design and interior design.
Petra Blaisse worked in collaboration with Rem Koolhaas and the Office for Metropolitan Architecture on many projects including Seattle Central Library (Seattle, 2004), Casa da Música (Porto, 2001–2005), CCTV HQ (Beijing, 2004–2009).The firm also collaborated with architectural firm SANAA for the glass pavilion of the Toledo Museum of Art (Toledo, Ohio, 2006).

Selected projects

 Swarovski Office Building in Männedorf, 2009 (Landscape design)
 Muziekgebouw, Enschede, NL, 2008 (Stage curtain for the main auditorium)
 ‘Swamp Garden’, Almere, NL, 2007 (Execution of subterranean garden between parking lots)
 Plussenburgh Housing Complex, Rotterdam, NL, 2006 (Garden design, interior advisory, carpet design)
 Mercedes-Benz Museum, Stuttgart, Germany, 2006 (Darkening, sun and view filtering  curtains, brush wall)
 Seoul National University Museum of Art, South Korea, 2005 (Garden and curtains for lecture hall)
 Toledo Pavilion of Glass, USA, 2005 (Space defining, acoustic and darkening curtains, sun & UV screening voiles)
 Casa da Música, Porto, Portugal, 2005 (Acoustic, blackout and view filtering curtains, sun-screens; Advisory for interior and exterior finishes)
 Hackney Empire Theatre, London, UK, 2005 (Stage curtain, blackout, space-defining and acoustic curtains)
 Seattle Central Library, USA, 2004 (Landscape design for entrance plaza’s, street borders and transitional; Advisory on interior materials & finishes) Dutch Embassy, Berlin, Germany, 2004 (Darkening curtains, advisory on interior finishes, public park and glare control curtains) Prada Store Los Angeles, USA, 2004 (textile VIP-dressing room, advisory on interior finishes) The Mick Jagger Centre, Dartford (London), UK, 2000 (Two double curtain walls for acoustic, lighting and atmospheric program in concert hall, upholstery auditorium chairs) Downsview Park Competition, Toronto, Canada (Winner first prize), 2000
 State Penitentiary, Nieuwegein, NL, 1999 (Six prison gardens and parking area) Kunsthal, Rotterdam, NL, 1993 (Spiraling sound curtain wall with poured-in-place tracks in the concrete ceiling, furniture advisory. Design and execution of sloping garden with 6500 bulbs and 7 pear trees)BibliographyInside Outside'' (2007)

References

External links
Inside Outside website
Casa da Musica Official website
Interview with Petra Blaisse in Metropolis
Interview with Petra Blaisse by Melissa Milgrom
Article about Petra Blaise in Wall Street Journal (2007)

Architecture firms of the Netherlands
Textile designers
Dutch landscape architects